The 2015 Central and Western District Council election was held on 22 November 2015 to elect all 15 members of the Central and Western District Council.

Overall election results
Before election:

Change in composition:

Results by constituency

Belcher

Castle Road

Centre Street

Chung Wan

Kennedy Town & Mount Davis

Kwun Lung

Middle Levels East

Peak

Sai Wan

Sai Ying Pun

Shek Tong Tsui

Sheung Wan

Tung Wah

University

Water Street

References

2015 Hong Kong local elections
Central and Western District Council elections